Sereny is a surname. Notable people with the surname include:

Eva Sereny, Swiss photographer and film director
Gitta Sereny (1921–2012), Austrian-British biographer, historian, and investigative journalist
Krisztina Sereny (born 1976), Hungarian fitness competitor and porn actress